Centrolene muelleri is a species of frog in the family Centrolenidae. It is endemic to Peru and is known from the divide between the Huallaga and Marañón drainages, in the San Martín and Amazonas departments. The specific name muelleri honors Paul S. Müller, professor from Saarland University who supported Schulte's field work in Peru. This species is also known as Muller's giant glass frog and Müller's giant glass frog.

Habitat and conservation
Egg clutches are probably laid on leaves above streams.

This species seems to be associated with undisturbed habitats. It is probably negatively affected by habitat loss that is occurring in its range. Chytridiomycosis might also be a risk. It could be present in the Alto Mayo Protection Forest.

References

muelleri
Amphibians of the Andes
Amphibians of Peru
Endemic fauna of Peru
Amphibians described in 1993
Taxa named by William Edward Duellman
Taxonomy articles created by Polbot